Fannie May Goosby (born 1902, died after 1934) also known as Fannie Mae Goosby was an American classic female blues singer, pianist and songwriter. Ten of her recordings were released between 1923 and 1928, one of which, "Grievous Blues", she recorded twice. Goosby was one of the first female blues musicians to record her own material. She also was one of the first two blues singers to be recorded in the Deep South, the other being the dirty blues singer Lucille Bogan.

Details of her life outside the recording studio are minimal.

Biography
According to the blues researchers Bob Eagle and Eric S. LeBlanc, Goosby may have been born in Pinehurst, Georgia.

In early June 1923, Polk C. Brockman, an Atlanta-based furniture store owner, who had been instrumental in the distribution of disks for Okeh Records, went to New York to work out a new business deal with Okeh. He was asked if he knew of any artist in Atlanta that could justify a recording trip to Georgia. Brockman promised to return with an answer. At his next meeting with the Okeh Records board, he persuaded Ralph Peer to record Fiddlin' John Carson. At the same recording sessions, probably on June 14, 1923, Peer also recorded "The Pawn Shop Blues", sung by Lucille Bogan, and Goosby singing her own composition "Grievous Blues", for which she accompanied herself on the piano, with a trumpet part played by Henry Mason. It is notable as the first rural blues to be recorded. Goosby wrote most of her own songs, which was then a rarity among female blues singers. Carson, Bogan, and Goosby were subsequently invited to New York to record more tracks. Goosby recorded another version of "Grievous Blues" and five more songs in September and October of that year, all of which were released by Okeh.

Goosby also accompanied Viola Baker in March 1924 on Baker's recording of "Sweet Man Blues".

Goosby recorded another four tracks in March 1928, which appeared on the Brunswick label. One of these was "Fortune Teller Blues", by Levi B. Byron and originally recorded by Geneva Gray on November 4, 1926.  Later recordings by Martha Copeland, Viola McCoy, and Rosa Henderson was of another song with the same title, which was composed by Porter Grainger.

Eagle and LeBlanc stated that Goosby was last reported alive in New York around 1934. No further biographical information about her later life has been discovered.

Songs
All songs were written by Goosby, except as indicated otherwise.

Compilation albums
Piano Singer's Blues: Women Accompany Themselves (Rosetta Records, 1982) includes Goosby's "Fortune Teller Blues"
Female Blues Singers Vol. 7 (Document Records, 2005) includes Goosby's "Grievous Blues" and "Goosby Blues"

See also
List of classic female blues singers

References

1902 births
20th-century deaths
Year of death uncertain
American blues singers
20th-century African-American women singers
Classic female blues singers
African-American pianists
American blues pianists
20th-century American women pianists
20th-century American pianists
Songwriters from Georgia (U.S. state)
Singers from Georgia (U.S. state)
20th-century American women singers
20th-century American singers
African-American songwriters